The Junkers K 16 was a small airliner produced in Germany in the early 1920s. It was a conventional, high-wing cantilever monoplane of all-metal construction, equipped with fixed, tailwheel undercarriage. The pilot sat in an open cockpit, while the two passengers were provided with an enclosed cabin within the fuselage. Shortly after the prototype flew, aircraft production in Germany was brought to a complete halt by the Allies, and the K 16 was quickly evacuated to the Netherlands to avoid confiscation. There, it was stored by Fokker until the restrictions were relaxed and work recommenced at Junkers' Dessau factory in 1924. By this time, however, the airline niche that the tiny K 16 had been intended to fill no longer existed, and the small number that were produced were mostly sold to private owners. Junkers entered two K 16s in the 1925 Deutsche Rundflug, with one machine winning second place in the competition.

Variants

 K 16 - initial version with Siemens-Halske Sh 4 engine, later changed to Sh 5
 K 16a - modified undercarriage and rear fuselage (modified from prototype)
 K 16b - production versions with new wing and a variety of engine choices:
 K 16ba - Siemens-Halske Sh 5 engine
 K 16bi - Siemens-Halske Sh 20 engine
 K 16bo - Walter NZ 120 engine
 K 16c - as K 16b but with modified nose section to accommodate engine change
 K 16ce - Bristol Lucifer engine

Specifications (K 16 prototype)

References

 
 
 Hugo Junkers Homepage
 Уголок неба

1920s German airliners
K 16
High-wing aircraft
Single-engined tractor aircraft